Kingpin (ISSN 0969-2150) is a chess magazine published intermittently in the UK. Its editor is Jonathan Manley.

History and profile
Kingpin was founded in 1985. Among contributors are GMs Stuart Conquest, James Plaskett, Nigel Davies, Jonathan Rowson, Aaron Summerscale, Glenn Flear, Chris Ward and Anthony Kosten. The magazine includes humorous articles about chess.

References

External links
Kingpin Chess Magazine
Book Reviews: Kingpin

1985 in chess
1985 establishments in the United Kingdom
Chess magazines published in the United Kingdom
Chess in the United Kingdom
Magazines established in 1985
Irregularly published magazines published in the United Kingdom